Harry Bruce Woolfe CBE, (1880, Marylebone, London – 1965, Brighton) was an English film producer and occasional director who founded British Instructional Films. The company focused on documentaries, nature films, and works concerning World War I. He was himself a veteran so had an interest in using film to re-enact the war. This links to his being referred to as an "ardent imperialist" who intended to tell heroic stories of said war. In addition to work on war films he initiated the Secrets of Nature series.

Select filmography

Director 
 1933 : A Typical Rural Distribution System
 1933 : Electricity: From Grid To Consumer
 1932 : England Awake
 1925 : Sons Of The Sea
 1924 : Zeebrugge
 1923 : Armageddon
 1921 : The Battle Of Jutland

Producer 
 Armageddon (1923)
 Boadicea (1927)
 The Battles of Coronel and Falkland Islands (1927)
 Shooting Stars (1927)
 Bolibar (1928)
 Underground (1928)
Chamber of Horrors (1929)
 The Runaway Princess (1929)
 The Celestial City (1929)
 Tell England (1931)
 Dance Pretty Lady (1931)

References

External links

1880 births
1965 deaths
English documentary filmmakers
English film producers
British military personnel of World War I
20th-century English businesspeople
People from Marylebone